Abies minor is a taxonomic synonym that may refer to:

 Abies minor  = Abies balsamea
 Abies minor  = Abies alba

References